The name Rolly has been used for three tropical cyclones in the Philippines by PAGASA in the Western Pacific Ocean.

 Typhoon Ma-on (2004) (T0422, 26W, Rolly) – became a super typhoon and made landfall on the Izu Peninsula, Honshū, Japan.
 Tropical Depression Rolly (2008)
 Typhoon Goni (2020) (T2019, 22W, Rolly) – made landfall as a Category 5–equivalent super typhoon on Catanduanes in the Philippines and in Vietnam as a tropical storm.

Rolly was retired from use in the Philippine narea of responsibility following the 2020 Pacific typhoon season and will be replaced with Romina in 2024.

Ohio

References

Pacific typhoon set index articles